Takhtamukay (Teh̦utemyqwaj) is a rural locality (an aul) and the administrative center of Takhtamukaysky District of the Republic of Adygea, Russia, located  northwest of Maykop. Population: 

Before 1990, its name was Oktyabrsky.

Kurgans dated between the 2nd and 1st millennium BCE are located in the vicinity of the aul.

References

Rural localities in Takhtamukaysky District